Brigadier-General Giuseppe Garibaldi II (29 July 1879 – 19 May 1950), better known as Peppino Garibaldi, was an Italian soldier, patriot and revolutionary, and grandson of Giuseppe Garibaldi.

Biography
Garibaldi was born in Melbourne, Australia, the son of Ricciotti Garibaldi and Harriet Constance Hopcraft.

Together with his father, he took part in the Greco-Turkish War of 1897 alongside the Greeks and afterwards fought with the liberals against Cipriano Castro in Venezuela, and in other conflicts in South America. He volunteered and served with great distinction in the British Army during the Second Boer War, carrying with him a sword given to his grandfather by the working men of Tyneside, England, in 1854.

He served as a lieutenant colonel (teniente coronel) in the army of Francisco I. Madero during the initial victories of the 1910 Mexican Revolution. Plaza Garibaldi in Mexico City was named in honor of his actions in the battle of Nuevo Casas Grandes. Pancho Villa sacked Lt Col Garibaldi because of a bitter controversy over the credit for the victory at first battle of Ciudad Juárez in 1911, but the name of the plaza (formerly Pila de la Habana) stuck nonetheless, despite the way he left the Army of the Revolution.

Garibaldi again served with the Greek Army during the First Balkan War in 1912.

At the outbreak of World War I, Garibaldi joined the French army at the head of the 4e régiment de marche du 1er étranger  and later fought on the Italian front for Italy. In November 1915 his unit was the one that planted the Italian flag on the summit of Col di Lana. For this he received a promotion to colonel. He was promoted to brigadier-general in June 1918, retiring from the military one year later.

Garibaldi opposed the National Fascist Party régime of Benito Mussolini which came to power in 1922 (while his younger brother Ezio favored it). He eventually left Italy for the United States, where he married Madalyn Nichols Taylor. In 1940 he returned to Italy, where in 1943 the German authorities arrested and imprisoned him in the Regina Coeli prison in Rome. After the war he retired to private life.

He died in Rome in 1950, aged 70.

Plaza Garibaldi in Mexico City 

In 1921, during the celebrations of the first centenary of the consummation of the Independence of Mexico, the old tianguis El Baratillo of Mexico City changed its name to Plaza Garibaldi in honor of Peppino Garibaldi, (also known as Plaza Santa Cecilia), which It is famous for the groups of mariachis, norteño groups, romantic trios and Veracruz music groups that meet there, dressed in their typical attire and equipped with their musical instruments to carry out a serenade.

Family tree

Bibliography
Notes

References 

 - Total pages: 672

External links
 
 

1879 births
1950 deaths
Italian anti-fascists
Italian generals
Italian revolutionaries
Italian philhellenes
Italian expatriates in Mexico
People of the Mexican Revolution
Officers of the French Foreign Legion
French generals
Greek military personnel of the Greco-Turkish War (1897)
Greek military personnel of the Balkan Wars
Italian people of English descent
Italian people of Brazilian descent
Garibaldi family
Italian expatriates in Australia